Allium funckiifolium is a plant species from Hubei and Sichuan Provinces in China. It grows in moist locales at elevations of 2200–2300 m.

Allium funckiifolium is unusual in the genus in producing one large, egg-shaped to heart-shaped leaf up to 25 cm long and 16 cm across. Scape is up to 70 cm tall. Umbel is spherical with many white flowers.

References

funckiifolium
Onions
Flora of China
Flora of Sichuan
Flora of Hubei
Plants described in 1920